The National Sports Council (NSC) is the national overseer of the control authorities of 41 different sports in Bangladesh. It is responsible to the Bangladesh Ministry of Youth and Sports and is based in Purana Paltan, Dhaka.

History 
After the Bangladesh Liberation War, the Bangladesh Sports Control Board was formed in 1972. In 1974 it became the National Sports Council.

See also
 Bangladesh Olympic Association

References

External links 
 Official website of NSC

Sport in Bangladesh
1972 establishments in Bangladesh